Epiphthora hexagramma is a moth of the family Gelechiidae. It was described by Edward Meyrick in 1921. It is found in Australia, where it has been recorded from Queensland.

The wingspan is about 15 mm. The forewings are white with about six irregular longitudinal slender streaks of fuscous irroration (sprinkles). The hindwings are rather dark grey.

References

Moths described in 1921
Epiphthora
Taxa named by Edward Meyrick